Phalonidia dangi is a species of moth of the family Tortricidae. It is found in Canada, where it has been recorded from Alberta.

References

Moths described in 1997
Phalonidia